The 1955 Grand National was the 109th renewal of the Grand National horse race that took place at Aintree Racecourse near Liverpool, England, on 26 March 1955.

Thirty horses ran in the race, which was won by 100/9 shot Quare Times, who was ridden by jockey Pat Taaffe and trained by Vincent O'Brien. This was O'Brien's third consecutive Grand National win.

Early Mist, the previous year's winner and another O'Brien-trained mount, was the favourite. In attendance at Aintree were The Queen Mother (who owned M'as Tu Vu who was also running in the race), and her daughters Queen Elizabeth II and Princess Margaret.

Several fences had been reduced in severity following an outcry over four equine fatalities in the previous year's National. The heavy going meant the 16th fence (the Water Jump) was omitted — the first time in Grand National history that not all 30 fences were jumped.

Finishing order

Non-finishers

References

 1955
Grand National
Grand National
Grand National
20th century in Lancashire